Turgut Alp was one of the warriors and alps who fought for Ertuğrul, a Turkic leader and bey, and Ertuğrul's son Osman I, the founder of the Ottoman Empire. After the establishment of the Empire, he became one of its military commanders, serving Osman I, as well as his son, Orhan Gazi.

Life
During the early Ottoman Conquests in the reign of Osman I, Turgut Alp was sent to Angelacoma (present-day İnegöl) and he conquered the area. This area consisting some villages, was given to him by Osman I and his territory was called Turgut-ili (Province of Turgut). During the Siege of Bursa, Turgut Alp, along with Osman's warrior Mihal Gazi, participated in the conquest of Atranos Castle (later known as Orhaneli) in 1325, which played a key role in leading to the Ottoman conquest of Bursa during the reign of Sultan Orhan. He was also with Orhan during the conquest of Bursa (1326).

Burial place 
His tomb is located in the cemetery of Turgutalp (Genci) village, İnegöl, Turkey. The grave outside the Ertugrul Ghazi's mausoleum is an honorary grave, not the real burial place.

Legacy
In 1877, during the Russo-Turkish War (1877-1878), a city was founded and named "Turgutalp" after him in the then-Ottoman Empire.

In fiction 

Turgut Alp has been portrayed in the Turkish television series  (1988), Diriliş: Ertuğrul (2014—2019) and  Kuruluş: Osman (2019—).

See also 
Köse Mihal
Konur Alp
Abdurrahman Gazi

References 

13th-century people from the Ottoman Empire
14th-century people from the Ottoman Empire
Military personnel of the Ottoman Empire
14th-century Ottoman military personnel
Burials in Turkey